The following is a timeline of the history of the city of Bissau, Guinea-Bissau.

Prior to 20th century
 1687 - Portuguese trading post established in region of Papel people.
 1692 - Portuguese colonial Captaincy of Bissau founded.
 1707 - Portuguese fort dismantled and abandoned.
 1753 - Portuguese overcome Papel resistance, rebuild fort.
 1775 - Fortaleza de São José da Amura (fort) built.
 1859 - Municipal Council founded.
 1863 - Bissau attains town status.
 1869
 Bissau becomes capital of the colonial district of Guinea.
 Population: 573.

20th century
 1917 - Bissau attains city status.
 1935 - Bissau Cathedral built.
 1936 - Sporting Clube de Bissau formed.
 1937 - Estrela Negra de Bissau football club formed.
 1941 - Capital of colonial Portuguese Guinea moves to Bissau from Bolama.
 1944 - Sport Bissau e Benfica (football club) formed.
 1948 - City Market construction begins.
 1950s - Craveiro Lopes (airport) built.
 1950 - Population: 18,309.
 1959 - 3 August: Dockworkers strike at Porto Pidjiguiti; crackdown.
 1960 - Canal do Impernal (channel) dries up; Bissau no longer an island in the Geba River estuary.
 1968 - City besieged during the Guinea-Bissau War of Independence.
 1971 - City besieged during the War of Independence.
 1973 -  in business.
 1974 - City becomes capital of newly independent Guinea-Bissau.
 1977 - Roman Catholic Diocese of Bissau established.
 1979 - Population: 109,214.
 1984 - National Library of Guinea-Bissau headquartered in city.
 1985 - City joins the newly formed .
 1989 - Estádio 24 de Setembro (stadium) opens.
 1990 - 27 January: Catholic pope visits city.
 1991
  headquartered in city.
 Population: 197,600.
 1992 - Correio-Bissau newspaper begins publication.
 1996 - Rádio Bombolom begins broadcasting.
 1998
 7 June: Guinea-Bissau Civil War begins; residents flee from the city.
 Hotel Hotti Bissau in business.
 1999 - 10 May: Guinea-Bissau Civil War ends.

21st century
 2002 - Population: 292,000.
 2005 - National People's Assembly  built.
 2008 -  begins broadcasting.
 2009
 2 March: Assassination of president Vieira.
 Population: 387,909.
 2010 - Hospital Amizade China-Guine-Bissau opens.
 2012 - 12 April: 2012 Guinea-Bissau coup d'état.
 2022 - 1 February: 2022 Guinea-Bissau coup d'état attempt

See also
 Bissau history (de)
 List of governors of Portuguese Guinea, seated at Bissau 1941-1974
 History of Guinea-Bissau

References

This article incorporates information from the German Wikipedia, Portuguese Wikipedia, and Spanish Wikipedia.

Bibliography

in English
 
 
 
 
 
 

in other languages

External links

 

Bissau
Guinea-Bissau-related lists
History of Guinea-Bissau
Bissau
Bissau